Lists of air show accidents and incidents give lists of accidents and incidents at air shows. They include:
 List of air show accidents and incidents in the 20th century
 List of air show accidents and incidents in the 21st century